Amber Case (born Portland, Oregon) is an American cyborg anthropologist, user experience designer and public speaker. She studies the interaction between humans and technology.

Biography
Case was born in about 1986. She graduated with a bachelor's degree in sociology from Lewis & Clark College in 2008, having written a thesis about cell phones. In 2008, she co-founded CyborgCamp, an unconference on the future of humans and computers.

In 2010, Case and Aaron Parecki founded Geoloqi, a location-based software company. The company was acquired by Esri in 2012. In 2015, Case left Esri to work for a new company called Healthways where she became the managing director.

In her work, Case often declares that we are all cyborgs already, as a cyborg is simply a human who interacts with technology. According to Case the technology doesn't necessarily need to be implanted: it can be a physical or mental extension. She argues that these days we now have two selves: one digital, one physical. Her main focus in recent years is Calm technology, a type of information technology where the interaction between the technology and its user is designed to occur in the user's periphery rather than constantly at the center of attention. Case describes it as a technology that "gets out of your way and lets you live your life." In 2015 she published the book 'Calm Technology' on the subject.

Works
An Illustrated Dictionary of Cyborg Anthropology (CreateSpace, January 2014) 
Designing Calm Technology (O'Reilly Books, October 2015)
Designing with Sound: Fundamentals for Products and Services (co-author Aaron Day) (O'Reilly Media, Inc., December 2018)
A Kids Book About Technology (A Kids Book About, 2021)

Awards and honours
In 2010 Fastcompany magazine named Case as one of the most influential women in technology.

Appearances
In January 2011, Case performed a TED Talks titled 'We Are All Cyborgs Now.' 

Case gave a talk at the 'ePharma IMPACT' 2019 conference, which took place in 19–21 March 2019 in New York, NY.

References

External links

Cyborg Camp

Scientists from Portland, Oregon
1980s births
Living people
Lewis & Clark College alumni
American anthropologists